Geraldine Carr (January 10, 1914 – September 2, 1954) was an American film and television actress. She was best-known as Mabel in 30 episodes of the American situation comedy I Married Joan.

Life and career 
Carr started her career in the 1949 film A Kiss in the Dark. She played Mabel, the title character's best friend, in the situation comedy I Married Joan (1952–1955). Carr later appeared in television programmes including three episodes of The Loretta Young Show, and in the films The Long, Long Trailer, and The Sniper.

On stage, Carr appeared in Red, Hot and Blue and Voice of the Turtle.

Carr was married to musician Jess Carneol.

Death 
Carr died on September 2, 1954, aged 40, in an automobile crash in Hollywood, California.

Filmography

Film

Television

References

External links 

Rotten Tomatoes profile

1914 births
1954 deaths
Actresses from San Francisco
American film actresses
American television actresses
20th-century American actresses
American stage actresses